The 2016 Wrocław attack was a terrorist incident, that occurred at 2 p.m. on 19 May 2016. A package bomb was detonated next to a bus, injuring one person. The package was a cooker containing nails and explosives. A week later, a 22-year-old chemistry student  was arrested suspected of carrying out this home-made bomb attack.

References 

2016 in Poland
Terrorist incidents in Europe in 2016
Terrorist incidents in Poland
Failed terrorist attempts in Europe
May 2016 events in Europe
May 2016 crimes in Europe
History of Wrocław
2016 crimes in Poland